Francesco Verla (1470- circa 1521) was an Italian painter of the Renaissance period, active in Northern Italy.

Biography
He was born in Villaverla and died in Rovereto. He was a follower of Bartolomeo Montagna, and influenced by Mantegna and Perugino. He is described by some, however, as emerging from the School of Vicenza. An Enthroned Madonna and Child with Saints Joseph and Francis (1520) at the  Pinacoteca di Brera, Milan, is attributed to Verla. A drawing depicting the Baptism of Christ at the Morgan Library and Museum in New York is attributed to Verla.

Bibliography 
 Mauro Lucco (a cura di), Mantegna a Mantova 1460-1506, catalogo della mostra, Skira Milano, 2006.
Francesco Verla, pittore (Villaverla, 1470 cr. - Rovereto, 1521). by Lionello Puppi, CAT, 1967.

External links

1470 births
1521 deaths
15th-century Italian painters
Italian male painters
Italian Renaissance painters